Sillaphyton is a monotypic genus of flowering plants belonging to the family Apiaceae. Its only species is Sillaphyton podagraria, native to Korea.

References

Apioideae
Monotypic Apioideae genera